Monostromataceae is a family of green algae in the order Ulotrichales.

References

External links

Ulvophyceae families
Ulotrichales